Beowulf, in comics, may refer to:

 Beowulf (DC Comics), a DC Comics character and eponymous series starting in 
 Beowulf, a 1984 graphic novel, First Graphic Novel #1, from First Comics
 Beowulf, a 2005 series from Speakeasy Comics
 Beowulf, a 2006 series from Antarctic Press
 Beowulf, a 2007 mini-series, and film adaptation, from IDW Publishing
 Beowulf, a 2007 graphic from HarperCollins
 Beowulf: The Graphic Novel, a 2007 graphic novel from Markosia
 Gods of War, A 2016 Marvel series where Beowulf appears.

See also
List of artistic depictions of Beowulf#Comics
Beowulf (disambiguation)

References